Clàudia Valls Anglés is a mathematician and an expert in dynamical systems. She is an associate professor in the Instituto Superior Técnico of the University of Lisbon in Portugal.

Education
Valls completed a doctorate at the University of Barcelona in 1999.

Books
Valls is the co-author of books with Luís Barreira and others, including:
Instability in Hamiltonian systems (with Antonio Pumariño, Electronic Journal of Qualitative Theory of Differential Equations Monograph Series, Vol. 1, 2005)
Stability of nonautonomous differential equations (with Luís Barreira, Lecture Notes in Mathematics, Vol. 1926, Springer, 2008)
Complex analysis and differential equations (with Luís Barreira, Springer Undergraduate Mathematics Series, Springer, 2012), translated into French as Analyse complexe et équations différentielles (Enseignement SUP-Maths, EDP Sciences, 2011)
Exercices d’analyse complexe et équations différentielles [Exercises in complex analysis and differential equations] (with Luís Barreira, Enseignement SUP-Maths, EDP Sciences, 2011)
Equações diferenciais: Teoria qualitativa (with Luís Barreira, Ensino da Ciência e da Tecnologia, Vol. 33, IST Press, 2010), translated into English as Ordinary differential equations: Qualitative theory (Graduate Studies in Mathematics, Vol. 137, American Mathematical Society, 2012)
Dynamical systems: An introduction (with Luís Barreira and Davor Dragičević, Universitext, Springer, 2013; originally published in Portuguese in 2012)
Exercises in linear algebra (with Luís Barreira, World Scientific, 2016)
Admissibility and hyperbolicity (with Luís Barreira, SpringerBriefs in Mathematics, Springer, 2018)
Dynamical systems by example (with Luís Barreira, Problem Books in Mathematics, Springer, 2019)

References

Year of birth missing (living people)
Living people
21st-century Spanish mathematicians
21st-century Portuguese mathematicians
Women mathematicians
Dynamical systems theorists
University of Barcelona alumni
Academic staff of the University of Lisbon